Pristimantis metabates is a species of frog in the family Strabomantidae. It is known from the Bagua Province of Amazonas Region of Peru and Zamora-Chinchipe Province of southern Ecuador. Its natural habitats are tropical moist forests, especially near streams.

References

metabates
Amphibians of Ecuador
Amphibians of Peru
Amphibians described in 1999
Taxonomy articles created by Polbot